The 1971 Arizona Wildcats football team represented the University of Arizona in the Western Athletic Conference (WAC) during the 1971 NCAA University Division football season.  In their third season under head coach Bob Weber, the Wildcats compiled a 5–6 record (3–3 against WAC opponents), finished in third place in the WAC, and were outscored by their opponents, 232 to 191.  The team played its home games in Arizona Stadium in Tucson, Arizona.

The team's statistical leaders included Bill Demory with 1,384 passing yards, Bob McCall with 525 rushing yards, and Charlie McKee with 854 receiving yards.

This was the first season in which Arizona played eleven regular season games, as the NCAA announced plans to expand the regular season.

Schedule

Game summaries

Washington State

Arizona started the season strong with a win over Washington State and won their first road game since 1968, when they defeated Utah, and breaking a nine-game road losing streak dating back to that season.

Arizona State

In the season finale at Arizona State, the Wildcats never stood a chance against the Sun Devils, and were shut out. As of 2021, this remains Arizona State's most recent shutout victory over the Wildcats in Tempe.

References

External links
  Game program: Arizona vs. Washington State at Spokane – September 18, 1971

Arizona
Arizona Wildcats football seasons
Arizona Wildcats football